Sorsa is a Finnish surname. Notable people with the surname include:

Kalevi Sorsa (1930–2004), Finnish politician
Riki Sorsa (1952–2016), Finnish singer
Sebastian Sorsa (born 1984), Finnish footballer

Finnish-language surnames